Class 27 may refer to:

 British Rail Class 27, diesel locomotive
 L&YR Class 27, steam locomotive
 SNCB Class 27, electric locomotive